is a beat 'em up video game for the Xbox home console. It was developed by Dimps and published by Sega, and is a successor to Sega's SpikeOut series.

Reception

The game received "mixed" reviews according to the review aggregation website Metacritic.  In Japan, Famitsu gave it a score of all four sevens for a total of 28 out of 40.

References

External links

2005 video games
Cooperative video games
Dimps games
Sega beat 'em ups
Video games developed in Japan
Video games featuring female protagonists
Xbox-only games
Multiplayer and single-player video games
Xbox games